The white-shouldered black tit (Melaniparus guineensis), also known as the pale-eyed black tit, is a passerine bird in the tit family. It breeds in a belt across Africa from Senegal in the west to Kenya and Ethiopia in the east. It is sometimes considered conspecific with the more southerly white-winged black tit Melaniparus leucomelas and, like that species, it is mainly black with a white wing patch, but differs in that it has a pale eye.

It is a resident in coniferous woodlands throughout its range, and nests in tree crevice. 4-6 reddish-brown blotched pinkish-white eggs are laid.

The white-shouldered black tit was formerly one of the many species in the genus Parus but was moved to Melaniparus after a molecular phylogenetic analysis published in 2013 showed that birds in the new genus formed a distinct clade.

References

Harrap and Quinn, Tits, Nuthatches and Treecreepers 

white-shouldered black tit
Birds of Sub-Saharan Africa
white-shouldered black tit